Jacqueline may refer to:

People 
 Jacqueline (given name), including a list of people with the name

 Jacqueline Moore (born 1964), ring name "Jacqueline", American professional wrestler

Arts and entertainment 
 Jacqueline (1923 film), an American silent film directed by Dell Henderson
 Jacqueline (1956 film), a British film directed by Roy Ward Baker
 Jacqueline (1959 film), a West German film directed by Wolfgang Liebeneiner
 Jacqueline (painting), a 1961 portrait by Pablo Picasso
 "Jacqueline" (The Coral song), 2007
 "Jacqueline", a song from the album Revolver Soul by Alabama 3
 "Jacqueline", a song from the album Franz Ferdinand by Franz Ferdinand
 "Jacqueline", a song from the album Undercurrent by Sarah Jarosz

Other uses 
 1017 Jacqueline, an asteroid